Tony Fiala (born 2 February 1966) is a Canadian former biathlete who competed in the 1992 Winter Olympics held in Albertville, France.

References

1966 births
Living people
Canadian male biathletes
Olympic biathletes of Canada
Biathletes at the 1992 Winter Olympics